Joggy Bear is a children's character created by Simon Gould, who tours with fitness guru Lizzie Webb.  Joggy appeared in his own television series for Channel 4 in the 1980s and 1990s, in which Webb also starred in. The character teaches children about exercise and keeping fit. 

Lizzie Webb, often known as "Mad Lizzie", presented exercise routines on the show. She created many workouts, such as "Shake-out with Lizzie and Joggy", which she and Joggy would create in every show to try to keep children active and Joogy fit. Joggy bear was number 2 in the video charts in the early 1990s. There were many videos made in the 1990s and two DVDs in 2005. Lizzie Webb and Joggy Bear now tour schools and venues around the UK.

"Joggy Bear" was played by the young actress Sophie Barnard, who famously has also been "Pudsey Bear" on BBC's UK charity show Children in Need. Sophie Barnard also played a role in the BAFTA Award winning children's television program Teletubbies, in which she has been acting as character Laa-Laa. Sophie got the role as Joggy Bear after auditioning for the role and being selected as the most qualified of the six applicants. Controversy broke out around Sophie's appointment to the role after it was rumoured that she entered into a relationship with Joggy Bear Producer Simon Gould. 

Although the TV show ended in the early 1990s, Joggy has since continued, mainly off screen.  Lizzie now tours with Joggy across the UK in 'Joggy's Keep Fit Club'.

UK VHS releases

UK DVD releases

References

External links
 website includes a poster and a story.

Television characters
Fictional anthropomorphic characters
Fictional bears